Mark Freeman (September 27, 1908 – February 6, 2003) was an Austrian-born American artist, "whose prints and paintings from the 1930s chronicle a seminal period of New York City's architectural growth in a style that has been described (by Will Barnet) as a beautiful blend of the poetic and historical."

Biography
Freeman was born in 1908 in Zaleszczyki, Austria, and came to New York City in January 1923.

Freeman had a BA from Columbia College, a Bachelor of Architecture from Columbia University, a Master of Architecture from Columbia, and a Diploma of Art and Archaeology from the Sorbonne in Paris. He also studied at the National Academy of Design.

He and his wife Polly Allen (who died before him) were married for 67 years. They had two sons and seven grandchildren. Freeman died in 2003 in New York City.

Administrative art offices
1972-1988 President, National Society of Painters in Casein and Acrylic
1975-1977 President, American Society of Contemporary Artists
1975-1976 President, League of Present Day Artists
1977-1979 President, Audubon Artists
1976-1983 Vice-President, New York City Artists Equity Association
1976-1983  Vice-President, Artists Welfare Fund
1976-1992 Chairman, Art Committee, Lotos Club, New York
1978-1982 Advisory Board, "Who's Who in American Art"
1978-1983 Editor, New York City Artists Equity Newsletter
1978-1983 Coordinator, Artists Welfare Fund
1983-1988 Consultant, New York City Artists Equity
1981-1988 Board of Trustees, Artists Fellowship
1988-2003  Advisory Board, Artists Fellowship

Awards 
Honorary Life President, Audubon Artists
Honorary Life President, National Society of Painters in Casein and Acrylic
Associate Member, National Academy of Design  (A.N.A.)

Selected exhibitions
1968, 1969 Institute of Arts and Letters
80 American Prints, State Dept. Traveling Exhibition Europe and North Africa
International Biennials of Color Lithography
1951, 1953, 1955 Cincinnati Museum of Art
1964 (solo exhibition) Parrish Art Museum, Southampton, NY
15 Artists of the Region, Guild Hall, East Hampton, NY
New Print Techniques, Philadelphia Museum of Art, Philadelphia, PA
Printmakers of Long Island, Parrish Art Museum, Southampton, NY
South Fork Artists, from Childe Hassam to Jackson Pollock
Four Printmakers, Guild Hall, East Hampton, NY
1990 Detroit Art Institute, Detroit, MI
1990 Bergen Art Museum, Paramus, NJ
1991 Elliot Art Museum, Stuart, FL

Represented in permanent collections
Museum of Modern Art (MoMA), New York City
British Museum, London, England
Whitney Museum of American Art, New York City
Metropolitan Museum of Art, New York City
National Academy of Design, NY
Brooklyn Museum, NY
Queens Museum of Art, NY
Museum of the City of New York
Library of Congress, Washington, D.C.
Hengeloose Kunstzaal, the Netherlands
Corcoran Gallery of Art, Washington, D.C.
National Museum of American History (Smithsonian Institution), Washington, D.C.
Butler Institute of American Art, OH
Herbert F. Johnson Museum of Art, Ithaca, NY
Norfolk Art Museum, VA
Elliott Museum, Stuart, FL
Fort Wayne Art Museum, Indiana
Holyoke Art Museum, MA
Springfield Art Museum, MA
Boston Library, Boston, MA
Wolfson Foundation, Miami, FL
Slater Art Museum, CT
Parrish Art Museum, Southampton, NY
Guild Hall, East Hampton, NY
Lotus Club, NY
Wichita Art Museum, Kansas
St. Vincent's College, PA
New Britain Museum of American Art, CT

References

 Smithsonian Institution Research Information System; Archival, Manuscript and Photographic Collections, Mark Freeman

Bibliography
 Peter H Falk; Audrey M Lewis; Georgia Kuchen; Veronika Roessler, Who was Who in American Art 1564–1975 , 
 Mark Freeman, New York 1929–1932: Reaching for the Sky

External links 
Mark Freeman artworks in Artnet

1908 births
2003 deaths
20th-century American painters
American male painters
Modern painters
Austrian emigrants to the United States
Painters from New York City
Columbia Graduate School of Architecture, Planning and Preservation alumni
20th-century American printmakers
Columbia College (New York) alumni
20th-century American male artists